Gonolabis is a genus of earwigs in the subfamily Anisolabidinae. It was cited by Srivastava in Part 2 of Fauna of India.

Species
The genus includes the following species:

 Gonolabis dentata Steinmann, 1981
 Gonolabis electa Burr, 1910
 Gonolabis forcipata Burr, 1908
 Gonolabis gilesi Steinmann, 1981
 Gonolabis rossi Brindle, 1987
 Gonolabis tasmanica (Bormans, 1880)
 Gonolabis woodwardi Burr, 1908

References

External links
 The Earwig Research Centre's Gonolabis database Source for references: type Gonolabis in the "genus" field and click "search".

Anisolabididae
Insects of Asia
Dermaptera genera